Bjørk Herup Olsen (born 2 October 1991) is a Faroese athlete. She is until now (2012) the best female middle and long distance runner in the Faroe Islands. Herup Olsen has won several Danish Junior Championships and holds several Faroese records. She was the first Faroese woman, who ran 3000 m under 10 minutes. Bjørk is running for the Faroese club Bragdið and for the Danish club Helsingør Idrætsforening
. She signed her letter of intent to run track at East Carolina University.

Personal records
 800 meter: 2:20.01 Gothenburg, Sweden 4 July 2010 (Faroese record)
 1500 meter: 4:37.83 Gothenburg, Sweden 3 July 2010 (Faroese record)
 3000 meter: 9:59,91 Pennsylvania, USA 28 January 2012 (Faroese record)
 5000 meters: 17.12,75 in Ohio, USA February 2012 (Faroese record)
 10,000 meters: 36:58,27 North Carolina 2012 (Faroese record)
 1500 meter - Indoors: 4.38,04 Reykjavík International Games, Iceland 17 January 2010
 1 mile - Indoors: 5:19,35 Reykjavík 20 January 2008
 3000 meter - Indoors: 10.02,47 Skive, Denmark 6. marts 2010 (Faroese indoor record)

References

 Foroya.fo, Bjørk Herup Olsen ger aftur um seg. (Faroese)
 Sportal.fo, Gull til Bjørk og Rúna. (Faroese)
 Kringvarp.fo, Bjørk vann gull í Íslandi. (Faroese)
 Statletik.dk Bjørk Herup Olsen - 91 - KIF (Danish)
 Portal.fo, Bjørk setti nýtt met (Faroese)
 afrek.fri.is (Icelandic)
 Kif-atletik.dk (Danish)

External links
 Bragdid.fo
 dansk-atletik.dk DM Inde, Ungdom, Skive (Danish Junior Championship. indoors, Skive Denmark, Feb. 2008, results)
 Statletik.dk - Indendørs rangliste Junior - 2009
 skiveam-sam.dk - DMU 2010 results (Danish Junior Championship 2010)

Danish female long-distance runners
1991 births
Living people
Faroese athletes
Faroese sportswomen
Danish female middle-distance runners